The 1955–56 Nationalliga A season was the 18th season of the Nationalliga A, the top level of ice hockey in Switzerland. Eight teams participated in the league, and EHC Arosa won the championship.

Regular season

Relegation 
 SC Bern - EHC Basel-Rotweiss 9:10

External links
 Championnat de Suisse 1955/56

National League (ice hockey) seasons
Swiss
1955–56 in Swiss ice hockey